TUG Entertainment (TUG stands for The Ultimate Group), was a record label/Management Company that was once home to such artists as B2K, Omarion, Marques Houston, Mila J, O'Ryan, Jhené Aiko, One Luv, 2 Much and NLT, Simon Phenix/Rawwtunez for Universal Records. TUG CEO Chris Stokes is responsible for many films involving TUG roster members e.g. You Got Served, and his most recent project is Somebody Help Me, a horror film which includes in its cast Omarion and Marques Houston.

The label is currently defunct.

Artist

Former artists 
 B2K - 4 Member Boy Band
 TG4 - 4 Member Girl Band
 Marques Houston - Solo Male Singer
 Young Rome - Solo Male rapper
 Omarion - Solo Male Singer
 O'Ryan - Solo Male Singer
 Ashley Rose - Solo Female Singer
 N2U - 4 Member Boy Band 
 Willie "Simon Phenix" Hill- Songwriter, Producer, Vocal Arranger
 Jane 3 - 3 Member Girl Band
 2 Much - 4 Member Boy Band
 Emmalyn Estrada - Solo Female Singer
 IMx - 3 Member Boy Band
 Monteco - Solo Male Singer
 Quindon Tarver - Solo Male Singer
 Gyrl - 3 Member Girl Band
 Dame - 4 Member Girl Band
 Jhené Aiko - Solo Female Singer
 Mila J - Solo Female Singer
 Juanita Stokes - Solo Female rapper/singer
 Timothy Hodge - Solo Male Singer
 NLT - 4 Member Boy Band

Films
 House Party 4: Down to the Last Minute (2001)
 You Got Served (2004)
 Somebody Help Me (2007)
 Somebody Help Me 2 (2010)

External links
 TUG Official Site
 Simon Phenix Official Site

American record labels
Hip hop record labels